Louis Jean Giammona (born March 3, 1953) is a former American football running back in the National Football League (NFL). He was selected by the New York Jets in the eighth round of the 1976 NFL Draft and played five seasons for the Philadelphia Eagles, including the 1980 team, which advanced to Super Bowl XV. He played college football at Utah State.

Giammona was selected to the Utah State Athletics Hall of Fame in 2010. He is the nephew of former NFL coach, Dick Vermeil.

References

1953 births
Living people
People from St. Helena, California
Players of American football from California
Sportspeople from the San Francisco Bay Area
American football running backs
Utah State Aggies football players
New York Jets players
Philadelphia Eagles players